The surface of Venus has been divided into 8 quadrangles at the 1:10,000,000 map scale, or 62 quadrangles at the 1:5,000,000 map scale.

1:10,000,000 map scale

1:5,000,000 map scale

See also 
 List of quadrangles on Mercury
 List of quadrangles on the Moon
 List of quadrangles on Mars

References 

Venus-related lists